Collier–Seminole State Park is a Florida State Park located on US 41,  south of Naples, Florida. The park is the home of a National Historic Mechanical Engineering Landmark, the Bay City Walking Dredge used to build the Tamiami Trail through the Everglades. Among the wildlife of the park are American alligators, raccoons, ospreys, and American white ibis. brown pelicans, wood storks, bald eagles, red-cockaded woodpeckers, American crocodiles, Florida black bears (Ursus americanus floridanus) and Big Cypress fox squirrels (Sciurus niger avicennia) also inhabit the park.

Activities include picnicking, hiking, bicycling, and canoeing, camping, wildlife viewing, fishing and boating. Amenities include an RV park, four pavilion picnic shelters, a boat ramp, and a full-facility campground with youth, group and primitive campsites. The park has a number of trails. A  canoe trail that flows down the Blackwater River through a mangrove forest. A  hiking trail runs through the park. A .9-mile nature trail features a boardwalk system and observation platform that overlooks the salt marsh. The park is open from 8:00 am until sundown year-round.

Gallery

References and external links

Collier–Seminole State Park
Florida State Parks – Collier–Seminole State Park

State parks of Florida
Parks in Collier County, Florida
Everglades
Mangroves
Protected areas established in 1947
1947 establishments in Florida
Nature centers in Florida
Buildings and structures in Naples, Florida
Landforms of Collier County, Florida
Wetlands of Florida